Alec Mathieu Georgen (born 17 September 1998) is a French professional footballer who plays as a right-back for  club US Concarneau on loan from AJ Auxerre.

Club career

Paris Saint-Germain
Georgen signed a three-year professional contract with Paris Saint-Germain (PSG) in July 2015. He made his professional debut on 24 January 2017, in the Coupe de la Ligue semi-final against Bordeaux. He replaced Lucas Moura after 88 minutes, in a 4–1 away win.

Loan to AZ
In January 2018, Georgen was loaned to AZ for the remainder of the 2017–18 season. He would play four matches for Jong AZ before returning to PSG.

Avranches
In September 2019, Georgen left PSG to join Championnat National club Avranches.

Auxerre
On 3 June 2020, Georgen signed for Ligue 2 side Auxerre. He put pen to paper for a three-year contract with the club.

Georgen made his debut for Auxerre in a 2–0 home loss to Sochaux on 22 August 2020. His first Coupe de France match came on 19 January 2021, as his team was victorious 1–0 over Troyes.

On 22 August 2022, Georgen was loaned to Concarneau.

Career statistics

Honours
Paris Saint-Germain U19
 Championnat National U19: 2015–16
 UEFA Youth League runner-up: 2015–16

Paris Saint-Germain
 Coupe de la Ligue: 2016–17

France U17
 UEFA European Under-17 Championship: 2015

Individual
 UEFA European Under-17 Championship: 2015 Team of the Tournament

References

External links

 
 
 

1998 births
Living people
People from Clamart
Association football defenders
French footballers
France youth international footballers
Paris Saint-Germain F.C. players
AZ Alkmaar players
Jong AZ players
US Avranches players
AJ Auxerre players
US Concarneau players
Ligue 1 players
Ligue 2 players
Championnat National players
Championnat National 2 players
Championnat National 3 players
Eerste Divisie players
Footballers from Hauts-de-Seine